Home Sweet Home is a single-player, first-person survival/horror/puzzle video game. It was developed by Thai developer Yggdrazil Group. The game features horror elements drawn from Thai folklore. It is available on Windows, PlayStation 4, Xbox One, and on VR devices.

The game focuses on the main protagonist Tim through two episodes. His life has drastically changed since his wife mysteriously disappeared. One night, he wakes up in a room in an unknown apartment building. While trying to find an exit, he is chased by a young female ghost. Players have to discover the mystery within Tim's house and find his missing wife Jane.

Gameplay 

A central feature of the game concerns stealth and hiding. If the ghosts or demons find the player in their hiding spot, the player can do a quick time event to escape, or will otherwise be killed and the game will respawn to the last save point. Exploration is also important, which is complemented by the fact that many areas have no dangers. Instead, the goal is to find diary pages, informative articles, or puzzle items.

Plot

The protagonist, a man named Tim, wakes up in an unfamiliar building unsure where his wife Jane is. Searching for her, he encounters a hostile female entity wielding a boxcutter that can teleport between pools of blood on the walls and floor. Escaping, he emerges from a stair cupboard in his own house. The whole thing had seemingly been a nightmare; Jane had gone missing some time before. Finding her diary, Tim goes back to the cupboard and he finds himself in a mysterious and dark wooden house mentioned in its pages. Trying to chase Jane, they are attacked and separated by a colossal hostile spirit called a Preta; a tortured soul being punished for its sins. Calming it with a food offering, Tim escapes to his home again finding it dark, ransacked, and Jane still missing. Finding a blood portal, Tim ends up in a haunted school chased by the female entity again, further hindered by numerous, normal-sized Pretas who alert her if they spot Tim.

Through notes, Tim learns that the entity, Belle, was an unstable and isolated student who fell in love with another student named Shane and put a lechery jinx on him to make him fall for her. However, the jinx backfired: she died leading Shane to commit suicide while Belle became a hostile ghost doomed to forever look for him. Using a hacksaw to cut through a blocked door and holy water to slow her down, Tim gets Belle to confront her deeds, allowing him to escape the school.

For the final segment of the first episode, the game switches to Jane's perspective, having been given a magical Penta-Metal knife by a novice monk to protect herself from the paranormal experiences haunting her, which Tim had not believed, forcing her to take matters into her own hands. Finding herself back in the wooden house, she is caught and dragged away by a hostile female entity in traditional Thai garb.

The second episode starts with Tim waking up in his house, now normal again, with a solar eclipse set to occur. Still struggling to cope with Jane's disappearance with heavy drinking and ignoring calls from his best friend Dew, he blacks out and wakes up in a dark forest strewn with eviscerated animal carcasses left by Krasue, predatory floating heads with dangling entrails. Hostile, zombie-like entities also roam the forest, chasing Tim across a bridge that collapses. Waking up in an old music school, Tim is forced to confront Ratri, the woman ghost in traditional garb. A beautiful but vain girl in life, she had made a deal with a spirit to get the main role in a big performance, but when her honest and hardworking sister Tida got the role instead, she framed Tida for stealing, leading to her death. This betrayal caused her to be possessed and killed by the spirit, leaving her to haunt the school as a spiteful ghost. Ratri is dangerous, able to teleport by possessing the many dress mannequins around the school, but Tida's spirit aids Tim in defeating her with Jane's knife, although Tim is badly wounded and passes out.

Having been rescued and healed by the novice monk, Tim wakes up in a temple. The novice explains that Tim and Jane are in a limbo-like realm called Hindrance for souls who cannot yet move on to the afterlife, but he urges Tim to return home and leave Jane citing that her fate cannot be changed. While chasing Jane again, Tim encounters Chai, an occultist who uses the Hindrance to trap and collect the souls of sinners for use in a ritual in conjunction with the eclipse to open the gates of Hell itself and obtain incredible power. Jane's knife proves ineffective and Chai's blind but powerful minion, the Executioner, attacks, cutting off two of Tim's fingers and shattering the knife. The Monk reforges it into a more powerful Nona-metal knife with Tim's help finding components, and Tim goes to confront Chai again but is captured and taken to an underground temple. Escaping, Tim barely manages to evade the Executioner, deafening him with gongs and shooting him with an old cannon, long enough to find Chai and stab him in the neck, embuing the knife and Tim's arm with additional power.

In a central chamber, Chai has collected the bodies of many grave sinners for use as blood sacrifices to open the portal, including Belle and Ratri. Here, Tim briefly reunites with Jane but Chai, fused into the Executioner's body, attacks and mortally wounds her. Tim defeats him once again and shares one last goodbye with Jane before being forced to flee as the Temple begins to collapse. Chai's disembodied head pursues Tim, but he escapes the Hindrance at last with the assistance of the Novice. Finding himself at his house, Tim finally answers Dew's call and accepts his offer to come over. Just before the credits roll, however, Tim shows his arm still retains whatever powers he obtained.

Development
Home Sweet Home is developed by Yggdrazil Group, a visual effects company primarily working on film post-production.

This is the company's first venture into game development; the project was led by Sarut Tubloy. Development took about 2 years, and went through multiple major revisions.

The team originally planned to make a mobile game, but changed to PC and restarted work after 7–8 months. They made another revision at 15 months, after receiving feedback from Steam Greenlight. They made another revision after releasing a demo on 16 November, 2016, spending an extra three months on revising the story.

Home Sweet Home has been planned as a series, and the story was written with possible sequels in mind.

Release

Demo 
The game demo was released on 16 November 2016, earning enthusiastic response. In the demo, the player plays as protagonist Chadchai Tubloy (Tim) who suddenly awakens in an unknown place. The player is occasionally chased by a ghost girl with a boxcutter who can teleport through portals of blood. The player explores the environment using stealth and solves some puzzles. The level ends when a shelf blocks the exit, followed by the aforementioned ghost girl providing a jump scare.

Full game release 
The full game was released on Steam on 27 September 2017. It offers 4 hours of gameplay.

Reception 

Home Sweet Home was positively received; critics commended the game's use of Thai mythological elements to create its frightening atmosphere. According to an IndieGames.com review, "Home Sweet Home demonstrates the ability to create terror without shoving gore and violence down your throat 24/7." Writing for The Telegraph, Olivia White describes the game, "It's filled with fantastically terrifying setpieces as you're forced to sneak, run and hide from the spirits who are after you."

Sequel
Home Sweet Home 2 was released on PC on September 25, 2019.

Home Sweet Home: Survive was released on PC on February 8, 2021.

References

Citations

General references
 Ganegeek. (2017, 11 16).
 MGR Online. (2018, 12 8). 
 Online station. (2018, 11 17).
 YGGDRAZIL Group. (2017).

External links
 

Action-adventure games
2010s horror video games
2017 video games
PlayStation 4 games
Windows games
Xbox One games
Indie video games
Unreal Engine games
Single-player video games
Video games developed in Thailand